The year 2008 is the 8th year in the history of World Extreme Cagefighting, a mixed martial arts promotion based in the United States. In 2008 WEC held 6 events beginning with, WEC 32: Condit vs. Prater.

Title fights

Events list

WEC 32: Condit vs. Prater

WEC 32: Condit vs. Prater was an event held on February 13, 2008 at the Santa Ana Star Center in Rio Rancho, New Mexico.

Results

WEC 33: Marshall vs. Stann

WEC 33: Marshall vs. Stann was an event held on March 26, 2008 at the Hard Rock Hotel and Casino in Las Vegas, Nevada.

Results

WEC 34: Faber vs. Pulver

WEC 34: Faber vs. Pulver was an event held on June 1, 2008 at ARCO Arena in Sacramento, California.

Results

WEC 35: Condit vs. Miura

WEC 35: Condit vs. Miura was an event held on August 3, 2008 at the Hard Rock Hotel and Casino in Las Vegas, Nevada.

Results

WEC 36: Faber vs. Brown

WEC 36: Faber vs. Brown was an event held on November 5, 2008 at the  Seminole Hard Rock Hotel and Casino in Hollywood, Florida.

Results

WEC 37: Torres vs. Tapia

WEC 37: Torres vs. Tapia was an event held on December 3, 2008 at the Hard Rock Hotel and Casino in Las Vegas, Nevada.

Results

See also 
 World Extreme Cagefighting
 List of World Extreme Cagefighting champions
 List of WEC events

References

World Extreme Cagefighting events
2008 in mixed martial arts